Shital Bhatia is an Indian film producer and co-founder of Friday Filmworks, best known for his movies like A Wednesday! (2008), Special 26 (2013), Baby (2015), M.S. Dhoni: The Untold Story (2016), Rustom (2016) and Toilet: Ek Prem Katha (2017).

Shital Bhatia along with Anil Ambani’s Reliance Entertainment have a joint venture named Plan C Studios.

Early life and education
Shital Bhatia was born and brought up in Mumbai. He graduated from Mithibai College with a degree in Bachelors of Commerce. Later on, he went on to do a diploma in Fashion Designing and graduated in the year 1995.

Career

In his early career, Shital started working as a costume/fashion designer for television from the year 1994 and continued working in the same field till 2000.

Very soon, Shital along with his colleague Neeraj Pandey, went on to start a production company called 'Quarter Inch Productions' which produced television shows and television films, Ittefaq being the most popular. Simultaneously, Shital also handled the production of foreign projects for a while in between.

Eventually in 2008, Shital and Neeraj Pandey formed their own production house named Friday Filmworks. Friday Filmworks produced movies like A Wednesday, Baby, Special 26 and the latest being M.S. Dhoni - The Untold Story.

He also produced OUCH, a short film by Neeraj Pandey starring Manoj Bajpayee and Pooja Chopra.

His upcoming projects include Toilet: Ek Prem Katha starring Akshay Kumar and Bhumi Pednekar and Aiyaary movie starring Sidharth Malhotra and Manoj Bajpayee.OUCH,

Awards 
 2008
A Wednesday - Star Screen Award

Filmography

Television

References

Living people
Hindi film producers
Film producers from Mumbai
Year of birth missing (living people)